Red Bluff Reservoir is a reservoir on the Pecos River  north of Pecos, Texas. The reservoir extends into Loving and Reeves Counties in Texas, and Eddy County in New Mexico. The northern shoreline of the reservoir is the lowest point in the state of New Mexico. The reservoir was formed in 1936 by the construction of a dam by the Red Bluff Water Control District to provide water for irrigation and hydroelectric power. The reservoir is also used for recreational activities.

Fish and plant life
Red Bluff Reservoir has been stocked with species of fish intended to improve the utility of the reservoir for recreational fishing and swimming.  Fish present in Red Bluff Reservoir include white bass and hybrid striped bass.  Vegetation in the lake includes sago pondweed.

Recreational uses
Fishing is a popular recreational use of the lake.

External links
Red Bluff Reservoir - Texas Parks & Wildlife

Reservoirs in Texas
Reservoirs in New Mexico
Protected areas of Loving County, Texas
Protected areas of Reeves County, Texas
Bodies of water of Eddy County, New Mexico
Buildings and structures in Eddy County, New Mexico
Protected areas of Eddy County, New Mexico
Pecos, Texas